Andres Miguel Ríos (born April 28, 1984 in Rosario, Santa Fe) is an Argentine racing driver. He has run in different series, and took part in 44 races. He achieved 2 wins, 9 podiums and no pole positions, with a race win percentage of 5%. In 2009 he raced with Julio Francischetti, ending in the 22º position.

Career highlights
Argentina Formula Renault
Italian Formula Renault Championship
FIA GT3 European Championship
TC2000

References

External links
 Official website

1984 births
Living people
Argentine racing drivers
TC 2000 Championship drivers
Formula Renault Argentina drivers
Italian Formula Renault 2.0 drivers